The 1962–63 Northern Rugby Football League season was the 68th season of rugby league football.

Season summary
1962–63 season saw the league split into two divisions with each team playing each other team home and away. The introduction of an even league meant the end of season championship play-off was done away with and the team finishing top of the table was declared champions.

1962-63 finished up with huge fixture backlogs similar to 1946-47 after "the Big Freeze" brought heavy snow and postponed most rugby league matches for two and half months.

Swinton won their fifth Championship. Oldham and Bramley were demoted to the Second Division.

The Challenge Cup winners were Wakefield Trinity who beat Wigan 25–10 in the final.

The 2nd Division Champions were Hunslet who were promoted along with second placed Keighley.

Workington Town (from Cumberland) won the Lancashire League, and Wakefield Trinity won the Yorkshire League. St. Helens beat Swinton 7–4 to win the Lancashire County Cup, and Hunslet beat Hull Kingston Rovers 12–2 to win the Yorkshire County Cup.

First Division

Second Division

Challenge Cup

Wakefield Trinity beat Wigan 25–10 in the challenge Cup Final played at Wembley, in front of a crowd of 84,492.

This was Wakefield Trinity's fifth Cup Final win in their fifth Final appearance and their second in successive seasons. Harold Poynton, their stand-off half was awarded the Lance Todd Trophy for his man-of-the-match performance.

County championships
Prior to the start of the league season in October, each team played eight fixtures in a regional competition, with teams being split into a Western and Eastern Division. The top four teams in each division competed in the play-offs for the Divisional Championship.

Western Division

Semi-finals

Final

Replay

Eastern Division

Semi-finals

Final

Lancashire Cup

Yorkshire Cup

References

Sources
1962-63 Rugby Football League season at wigan.rlfans.com
The Challenge Cup at The Rugby Football League website

1962 in English rugby league
1963 in English rugby league
Northern Rugby Football League seasons